Janette Mason is a British jazz pianist, arranger, composer and record producer. Three of her albums have received four-starred reviews in The Guardian and her second album, Alien Left Hand, was nominated for the Parliamentary Jazz Awards in 2010. The film scores she has written include the British dramas Ruby Blue (2008) and The Calling (2009).

In the 1990s Mason toured with such artists like Seal, Oasis, k.d. Lang and Robert Wyatt, and has also worked as Musical Director for Jonathan Ross and Antoine de Caunes. She has been a mainstay of the British jazz scene for over a decade and has toured in Europe, Israel, Japan, Thailand and the United States. She has also played at the Atlanta Jazz Festival and the Rochester Jazz Festival and at Carnegie Hall and the Royal Albert Hall. She has collaborated with Robert Wyatt and has performed his music.

Early life and education
Mason was born in Bushey, Hertfordshire and grew up in Wembley in  a musical household: her mother, who performed in the Gracie Cole Big Band, played jazz organ and vibraphone. She studied at the Guildhall School of Music and Drama and has a degree in musical composition for film and television.

Discography

Albums

Singles

Publications
 (with Steve Lodder) (2008) Totally Interactive Keyboard Bible, Jawbone. .

References

External links
Official website

Living people
20th-century births
21st-century English composers
21st-century jazz composers
21st-century British pianists
21st-century women composers
British women composers
British jazz keyboardists
English jazz pianists
British women pianists
British women record producers
English film score composers
English jazz composers
English record producers
Women film score composers
Musicians from Hertfordshire
People from Bushey
People from Wembley
Women jazz pianists
Year of birth missing (living people)
21st-century women pianists